Taylor–Whittle House is a historic home located at Norfolk, Virginia. It was built about 1791, and is a two-story, three-bay, 40 feet square, Federal style brick townhouse.  The house has a pedimented gable roof, and a small pedimented roof supported on Doric order columns over the porch.  It has a brick and frame rear kitchen ell.  There is a two-level Italianate style porch added to the garden side. The Norfolk Historic Foundation took possession of the house in 1972, and house has served as the offices of the Norfolk Historical Society and the Junior League of Norfolk-Virginia Beach until 2011.

It was listed on the National Register of Historic Places in 1971.

References

Houses on the National Register of Historic Places in Virginia
Federal architecture in Virginia
Italianate architecture in Virginia
Houses completed in 1791
Houses in Norfolk, Virginia
National Register of Historic Places in Norfolk, Virginia